The Hidden Valley mine is a gold mine in Papua New Guinea. The mine is located in the south-east of the country in Morobe Province. The mine has estimated reserves of 6.4 million oz of gold.

References 

Gold mines in Papua New Guinea